Douglas Clarke can refer to:

 Doug Clarke (Australian footballer) (born 1938), Australian rules footballer
 Doug Clarke (English footballer) (1934–2019), English footballer
 Douglas Clarke (conductor) (1893–1962), British conductor
 Douglas Clarke (English cricketer) (born 1948), English cricketer
 Douglas Clarke (New Zealand cricketer) (1932–2005), New Zealand cricketer

See also
 Douglas Clark (disambiguation)